Franz Czeisler (also known as The Great Tihany, June 29, 1916 – March 2, 2016) was a Hungarian circus impresario and illusionist.

Czeisler got his first job in the circus at the age of 12, feeding the animals.

In 1953, Czeisler travelled to Brazil with his wife and son and purchased a big top, which he used to start a circus. This eventually became the Circus Tihany, named after a town on Lake Balaton, Hungary. The Circus Tihany toured every country in Central and South America for over 40 years.

Awards 
 The Academy of Magical Arts Lifetime Achievement Fellowship (2001)

References 

1916 births
2016 deaths
Hungarian magicians
People from Kétegyháza
Academy of Magical Arts Lifetime Achievement Fellowship winners